Moloch Tropical  is a 2009 film about a political revolution in Haiti.

Plot 
Amidst the protection of a fortified palace perched on the top of a mountain, a democratically elected president and his closest collaborators are getting ready for a commemorative celebration dinner. Foreign chiefs of state and dignitaries of all sorts are expected to assist. However, the morning of the event, he awakens to find the country in an uprising. As the day goes on, rebellion rampages through the most popular neighborhoods and the guests call to cancel one after another. After consulting with his collaborators, the president decides to teach the demonstrators a lesson by sending in his private militia.

Awards 
 2010 Signis prize of World Catholic Association for Communication (Milano Film Festival)

Main film festivals selection 
 Toronto International Film Festival 2009 - Special Presentation
 Dubai International Film Festival 2009
 Berlin International Film Festival 2010 - Berlinale Special
 Tribeca International Film Festival 2010
 Sydney International Film Festival 2010 - International competition

External links 

 
 Velvet Film, Moloch Tropical

Films directed by Raoul Peck
2009 films
French drama films
Haitian drama films
English-language French films
English-language Haitian films
2000s French films